During the 1993–94 English football season, Tottenham Hotspur F.C. competed in the FA Premier League.

Season summary
Tottenham Hotspur were full of excitement in the close season when, after the controversial dismissal of chief executive and former manager Terry Venables, former player Ossie Ardiles returned to the club as manager. He quickly set about bringing the glory days back to White Hart Lane by creating a new style of attacking football which regularly featured up to five players in the forward positions. Striker Teddy Sheringham was prolific once again, scoring 13 goals despite being restricted to just 19 league games due to injuries.

But the new regime failed to deliver, and Tottenham finished 15th in the final table. This dismal showing was hardly helped by Sheringham's injury problems, but the rest of the side failed to come close to Sheringham when it came to scoring goals. Defeats were all too frequent, with a seven-match losing run in mid-season being the longest succession of defeats endured by any Premier League team during the season.

This was soon to be the least of Tottenham's worries, as the Football Association announced that they were investigating financial irregularities which had occurred at the club during the 1980s under the chairmanship of Irving Scholar. The hammer blow was delivered when Tottenham were found guilty on all the charges and received the heaviest punishment ever imposed on an English club; they were fined £600,000 as well as having 12 league points deducted for the 1994–95 season and being banned from that season's FA Cup. Chairman Alan Sugar quickly appealed against the ruling, backing up his argument with the fact that the people responsible were no longer at the club.

A defiant Ardiles, fearful that the 12-point deduction might end up costing them their Premiership status, made a momentous transfer swoop for German striker Jürgen Klinsmann and Romanian midfielders Ilie Dumitrescu and Gheorghe Popescu.

Final league table

Results
Tottenham Hotspur's score comes first

Legend

FA Premier League

FA Cup

League Cup

Players

First-team squad
Squad at end of season

Left club during season

Statistics

Appearances and goals

|-
! colspan=14 style=background:#dcdcdc; text-align:center| Goalkeepers

|-
! colspan=14 style=background:#dcdcdc; text-align:center| Defenders

|-
! colspan=14 style=background:#dcdcdc; text-align:center| Midfielders

|-
! colspan=14 style=background:#dcdcdc; text-align:center| Forwards

|-
! colspan=14 style=background:#dcdcdc; text-align:center| Players transferred out during the season

Goal scorers 

The list is sorted by shirt number when total goals are equal.

Clean sheets

References

Tottenham Hotspur F.C. seasons
Tottenham Hotspur